Diego González may refer to:

Association football
Diego González (footballer, born 1986) (Diego Armando González Vega), Chilean football forward
Diego González (footballer, born 1988) (Diego Hernán González), Argentine football midfielder
Diego González (footballer, born 1991) (Diego Ignacio González Reyes), Chilean football midfielder
Diego González (footballer, born January 1995) (Diego González Polanco), Spanish footballer
Diego González (footballer, born July 1995) (Diego Antonio González Morales), Mexican football midfielder
Diego González (footballer, born November 1995) (Diego Ignacio González Fuentes), Chilean former football midfielder
Diego González (footballer, born April 1998) (Diego Abraham González Torres), Chilean football defender
Diego González (footballer, born August 1998) (Diego Humberto González Saavedra), Chilean football midfielder
Diego González (footballer, born 2001) (Diego Armando González Salinas), Chilean football forward with Deportes Iberia
Diego González (footballer, born 2003) (Diego Luis González Alcaraz), Paraguayan football forward

Other
Diego González (actor) (Diego González Boneta, born 1990), Mexican singer and actor
Diego González (bishop) (died 1587), Spanish Roman Catholic bishop
Diego González (sailor) (born 1987), Chilean sailor
Diego González Holguín (1560–1620), Spanish Jesuit priest
Diego González Montero Justiniano (fl. 1662–1670), interim Royal Governor of Chile
Diego González Samaniego (died 1611), Roman Catholic bishop
Diego Tadeo González (1733–1794), Spanish poet

See also